The Department of Conservation and Recreation (DCR) is a state agency of the Commonwealth of Massachusetts, situated in the Executive Office of Energy and Environmental Affairs. It is best known for its parks and parkways. The DCR's mission is "To protect, promote and enhance our common wealth of natural, cultural and recreational resources for the well-being of all."  The agency is the largest landowner in Massachusetts.

History and structure

The Department of Conservation and Recreation was formed in 2003 under Governor Mitt Romney, when the former Metropolitan District Commission (MDC) and Department of Environmental Management (DEM) were merged to form the DCR. The DCR is under the general management of the Commissioner of the DCR. The general administration divisions; Human Resources Division, the Financial Division, and External and Legislative Affairs, report directly to the Commissioner. DCR is responsible for the stewardship of its lands, from general maintenance—such as emptying trash barrels, cutting grass, and making building improvements—to landscape-level management.

DCR also provides services beyond its boundaries, for example, Bureau of Forest Fire Control is available to aid and assist local cities and towns during natural disasters as well as periods of high fire danger, while its Bureau of Forestry administers forest management on both state and private lands. It also manages its land through the help of partners, including road repairs occasionally implemented by the Massachusetts Department of Transportation at the request of DCR.  Police protection has been provided by the Massachusetts Environmental Police and the Massachusetts State Police after the MDC's police department was merged into the State Police in 1992. The DCR also maintains its own Bureau of Ranger Services which provides for public safety, search & rescue, and enforces violations on DCR owned and managed property. In addition to partnering with state agencies, DCR coordinates with local and national volunteer organizations, such as the Mystic River Watershed Association, Friends of the Middlesex Fells, Appalachian Mountain Club, and local student organizations.

Division of State Parks

These areas are designated as either Woodlands, Parklands, or Reserves, and are managed to maintain specific land-use characteristics. From the agency's beginning in 2003 until 2012, DCR land management was organized into three divisions: State Parks and Recreation, Urban Parks and Recreation, and Water Supply Protection. In 2012, State Parks and Urban Parks were unified into one division.

Within the greater Boston area there are urban wilds, historic sites, and other naturally aesthetic or significant environmental properties. The origins of the collective environments in this part of the division date back to the creation of the Metropolitan Park Commission in 1893, forming the first such regional system in the United States. (see Metropolitan Park System of Greater Boston for history).

List of State Parks
 List of Massachusetts State Parks

Division of Water Supply Protection
The Division of Water Supply Protection manages  of watershed lands and is responsible for the protection of the drinking water supply  for approximately 2.5 million residents of Massachusetts, primarily in Greater Boston.   This division monitors lakes and ponds, well drillers, and rainfall throughout the Commonwealth.

Protected Water Supply Areas
 Quabbin Reservoir
 Ware River Watershed
 Wachusett Reservoir
 Sudbury Reservoir

Bureau of Engineering
The Bureau of Engineering provides professional engineering, design, and construction management services in support of DCR properties. The Bureau of Engineering managed and/or operated a number of bridges across the Commonwealth prior to November 2009. All non-pedestrian bridges were transferred to the Massachusetts Department of Transportation on November 1, 2009 as part of a transportation reform law. Originally, a certain number of bridges listed in the act creating MassDOT were to be transferred after December 31, 2014 when ongoing construction was completed. However, a Memorandum of Agreement between DCR and MassDOT instead transferred these bridges in 2009 along with all other DCR vehicular bridges.

List of parkways
The Bureau of Engineering manages and/or operates a number of parkways across the Commonwealth, including:

 Alewife Brook Parkway
 Arborway
 Birmingham Parkway
 Blue Hills Parkway
 Blue Hills Reservation Parkways
 Boylston Street (Back Bay sections)
 Breakheart Reservation Parkways
 Cambridge Parkway
 Carey Circle
 Charles River Reservation Parkways
 Charles Street (Charles Circle to Leverett Circle)
 Chestnut Hill Drive
 William J. Day Boulevard
 Fellsway Connector Parkways
 Fellsmere Park Parkways
 Fenway
 Fresh Pond Parkway
 Furnace Brook Parkway
 Hammond Pond Parkway
 Hull Shore Drive
 Jamaicaway
 Land Boulevard
 Lynn Fells Parkway
 Lynnway
 Lynn Shore Drive
 Memorial Drive
 Middlesex Fells Reservation Parkways
 Morrissey Boulevard
 Mount Greylock Summit Road
 Mount Wachusett Summit Road
 Mystic Valley Parkway
 Nahant Beach Boulevard
 Nantasket Avenue
 Neponset Valley Parkway
 North Beacon Street (Brighton & Watertown sections)
 Norumbega Road (Weston)
 Old Harbor Reservation Parkways
 Old Colony Parkway
 Park Drive
 Parkman Drive
 Quincy Shore Drive
 Recreation Road (Weston)
 Revere Beach Boulevard
 Revere Beach Parkway
 Riverway
 Stony Brook Reservation Parkways
 Storrow Drive
 Truman Parkway
 VFW Parkway
 West Roxbury Parkway
 Winthrop Parkway
 Winthrop Shore Drive

List of dams
The Bureau of Engineering owns and manages and/or operates a number of dams and flood control facilities across the Commonwealth, including:
 Irish Dam (Grafton)
 Moose Hill Reservoir Dam (Spencer)
 Pontoosuc Lake Dam (Pittsfield)
 Unionville Pond Dam (Holden)
 Charles River Dam (Boston)
 Watertown Dam (Watertown)

See also
 List of numbered routes in Massachusetts

References

External links
 Department of Conservation and Recreation website
 Roadways under the purview of DCR

State agencies of Massachusetts

Massachusetts Department of Conservation and Recreation

fr:Liste des parcs d'État du Massachusetts